Pastor Fletcher A. Brothers is a fundamentalist preacher and author from Carthage, New York.

Freedom Village
Brothers is best known as the founder of Freedom Village USA, a home for troubled teens operated from a Christian Fundamentalist perspective and founded in Lakemont, New York in 1981. The campus was the site of the Lakemont Academy, a secular boys boarding school. Freedom Village also operated an office in Burlington, Ontario and it had many students from Canada.

Freedom Village came under fire when it was revealed to be paying workers less than minimum wage, and for the punishment practiced on students, and for allegedly abusing child labor laws

Brothers had to sell the Lakemont property to cover his millions of dollars in debt after he was denied the ability to file for bankruptcy.

References

External links
Freedom Village USA
Freedom Village Canada

Year of birth missing (living people)
Living people
Christian fundamentalists